Dendra is a prehistoric archaeological site situated outside the village with the same name belonging to the municipality of Midea in the Argolid, Greece.

The site has a history stretching back at least to the early Bronze Age and is significant for the Bronze Age cemetery excavated by Swedish archaeologist Axel W. Persson in the first half of the 20th century. Persson excavated an unplundered tholos tomb and many Mycenaean chamber tombs, presumably belonging to the ruling classes having their dwelling at the nearby citadel of Midea.

Subsequent excavations (following partly successful attempts to plunder the unexcavated tombs) unearthed the unique and exquisite Dendra panoply of bronze armour, currently exhibited at the Archaeological Museum in nearby Nafplio. Later excavations also brought to light Bronze Age tumulus burials which included sacrificed horses.

See also 

 Swedish Institute at Athens

Sources
P. Mack Crew, J.B. Bury, I.E.S. Edwards, C.J. Gadd, John Boardman, and N.G.L. Hammond. The Cambridge Ancient History: c. 1800 – 1380 B.C Vol. II, pt. 2: c. 1380 – 1000 B.C. (Cambridge University Press), 1975. 
Swedish Institute at Athens - Dendra, Argolid: https://www.sia.gr/en/articles.php?tid=330&page=1

External links
Swedish Institute at Athens article about Dendra, Argolid - https://www.sia.gr/en/articles.php?tid=330&page=1
Argolis
Mycenaean sites in Argolis